Colby Daniel Lopez (born May 28, 1986) is an American professional wrestler. He is currently signed to WWE, where he performs on the Raw brand under the ring name Seth "Freakin" Rollins or simply Seth Rollins. He is credited for his in-ring ability and aptness of reinventing his on screen character.

Prior to signing with WWE, Lopez wrestled under the ring name Tyler Black for Ring of Honor (ROH) and was part of the Age of the Fall stable with Jimmy Jacobs. During his time in ROH he held the ROH World Championship once and the ROH World Tag Team Championship twice with Jacobs, and won the 2009 Survival of the Fittest tournament. Lopez also wrestled for various independent promotions including Full Impact Pro, where he was a one-time FIP World Heavyweight Champion, as well as Pro Wrestling Guerrilla, where he was a one-time PWG World Tag Team Champion, also with Jacobs. 

Lopez signed with WWE in 2010 and was sent to its developmental territory Florida Championship Wrestling (FCW), where he was renamed Seth Rollins and became the inaugural FCW Grand Slam Champion. After WWE rebranded FCW into NXT, he became the inaugural NXT Champion. Lopez debuted on WWE's main roster at the 2012 Survivor Series as part of a faction called The Shield, alongside Dean Ambrose and Roman Reigns. Rollins won his first main roster championship, the WWE (now Raw) Tag Team Championship - which he has since held a record six times - with Reigns. Rollins then went on to win the WWE World Heavyweight Championship, WWE Universal Championship, WWE Intercontinental Championship and the WWE United States Championship all twice each, making him the promotion's 29th Triple Crown Champion and 19th Grand Slam Champion, as well as the second wrestler to accomplish the latter twice under the revised 2015 format. He also won the 2014 Money in the Bank ladder match, the 2015 Slammy Award for Superstar of the Year and the 2019 men's Royal Rumble. All totaled, Rollins has won 15 championships in WWE. Rollins rose to superstardom as one of the major elements of The Reality Era and remains a central fixture in The New Era. After leaving The Shield, Rollins joined The Authority, establishing himself as the company's top villain. He has headlined numerous major pay-per-view events for WWE, including WrestleMania 31. 

Rollins topped Pro Wrestling Illustrateds PWI 500 list of the top 500 wrestlers in the world in both 2015 and 2019, and was named Wrestler of the Year by Sports Illustrated in 2022. Rollins is the only wrestler to cash in a WWE Money in the Bank contract at a WrestleMania event. He competed in the inaugural Universal Championship match at SummerSlam 2016 against Finn Bálor. He holds the record for the single longest televised TV match in WWE history, where he performed for 65 minutes straight, whilst defeating John Cena and Roman Reigns in the same night.

Early life
Lopez was born in Davenport, Iowa, on May 28, 1986. He is of Armenian, German, and Irish descent. His surname, Lopez, comes from his Mexican-American stepfather, whom he considered his true father. In 2019, he discovered via a DNA test that he had a long-lost brother and sister. He graduated from Davenport West High School in 2004. As a teenager, he was an introvert who lived a straight edge lifestyle and was a big fan of rock and heavy metal music. He trained at a wrestling school owned by Danny Daniels on the borders of Chicago and Oak Park.

Professional wrestling career

Independent circuit (2005–2009)

Lopez made his debut at the age of 19 in 2005, wrestling in the Iowa independent scene under the ring name Gixx. He then joined Ian Rotten's Independent Wrestling Association Mid-South (IWA) under the name Tyler Black, and entered the Ted Petty Invitational Tournament, defeating Sal Thomaselli before being eliminated by Matt Sydal in the quarterfinals in Hammond, Indiana on September 23, 2005.

He soon joined NWA Midwest and won the promotion's tag team championship with Marek Brave. The two retained the NWA Midwest Tag Team Championship against Ryan Boz and Danny Daniels, Brett Wayne and Hype Gotti and Jayson Reign and Marco Cordova several times in early 2006. He briefly appeared in Total Nonstop Action Wrestling (TNA) and teamed with Jeff Luxon in a loss to The Latin American Xchange (Homicide and Hernandez) on Impact! in October 2006.

On May 25, 2007, while in a match with then Full Impact Pro (FIP) Tag Team Champions The Briscoe Brothers (Jay and Mark Briscoe) in Melbourne, Florida, Black's tag team partner Marek Brave suffered a legitimate back injury, leading Black to pursue a singles career by competing in Pro Wrestling Guerrilla (PWG), where he defeated Joey Ryan in his debut on June 10.

At PWG's Life During Wartime on July 6, 2008, Black and Jimmy Jacobs won the PWG World Tag Team Championship by defeating Roderick Strong and El Generico, a replacement for Jack Evans. At FIP's event on December 20, Black defeated Go Shiozaki to win the FIP World Heavyweight Championship. At FIP's event on May 2, 2009, Davey Richards was awarded the FIP World Heavyweight Championship by forfeit when Black was unable to compete.

Ring of Honor

The Age of the Fall (2007–2009)

At the Ring of Honor (ROH) pay-per-view taping of Man Up on September 15, 2007, Black made his debut alongside Jimmy Jacobs and Necro Butcher, with the three attacking The Briscoe Brothers, and hanging Jay Briscoe from light rigging fashioned as a noose. The three formed a stable called The Age of the Fall. The angle was so controversial that ROH decided to remove the footage from the pay-per-view that was being taped at the event. Black later made his ROH in-ring debut later that night in a dark match, wrestling Jack Evans to a no contest.

At Glory by Honor VI in November, Black defeated Alex "Sugarfoot" Payne, but was attacked by The Briscoe Brothers following the match. He appeared with The Age of the Fall in their match against The Briscoe Brothers during the main event. At Final Battle on December 30, Black and Jacobs defeated The Briscoe Brothers to win the ROH World Tag Team Championship. They lost the championship one month later on January 26, 2008 to the No Remorse Corps (Davey Richards and Rocky Romero) when competing in an Ultimate Endurance match also involving The Hangmen 3 (Brent Albright and B. J. Whitmer), and the team of Austin Aries and Bryan Danielson.

At Take No Prisoners on May 30, Black unsuccessfully challenged Nigel McGuinness for the ROH World Championship. At Up For Grabs, Black and Jacobs won an eight-team tournament to win their second ROH World Tag Team Championship. The two lost the championship at Driven on November 14 to the team of Kevin Steen and El Generico. Black had a second chance at the ROH World Championship at Death Before Dishonor VI in New York City, when he faced McGuinness, Danielson and Claudio Castagnoli in a four-way elimination match, but McGuinness retained the title.

At Final Battle in December, after Black lost a number one contender match to Austin Aries, Jacobs turned on him, and Black was then attacked by Aries. At Full Circle, Black was given a non-title match against then-ROH World Champion Nigel McGuinness on January 16, 2009 where Black was victorious. The following night, Black faced McGuinness in a title match, which ended in a time limit draw. On June 26 at Violent Tendencies, Black defeated Jimmy Jacobs in a steel cage match to end their feud.

ROH World Champion and departure (2009–2010)
In September 2009, Black took a hiatus after receiving surgery on his neck. On October 10, Black defeated Kenny King in a first-round match and then Claudio Castagnoli, Colt Cabana, Delirious, Chris Hero and Roderick Strong in the finals to win the 2009 Survival of the Fittest tournament, earning him a ROH World Championship match. On December 19 at Final Battle, ROH's first live pay-per-view, Black wrestled then ROH World Champion Austin Aries to a 60-minute time limit draw. Because of this draw, then ROH commissioner Jim Cornette booked the two in a rematch between February 13, 2010 for the company's Eighth Anniversary Show. The booking saw Cornette set up a judging panel with himself on and one person picked by each competitor, in order for there to be a decisive winner in case of another draw. Aries picked King while Black picked Strong, whom he guaranteed an ROH World Championship title shot should he win. At the event, Black pinned Aries to win the ROH World Championship.

On April 3, Black retained the title in a three-way elimination match against Austin Aries and Roderick Strong at The Big Bang! pay-per-view on April 3. He also retained the title on June 19 at the following pay-per-view, Death Before Dishonor VIII, in a match against Davey Richards. Black turned into a villain at the August 20 tapings of Ring of Honor Wrestling after news broke that he had signed a developmental contract with World Wrestling Entertainment (WWE). He threatened to take the ROH World Championship with him to WWE and refused to put the championship at stake in a match with Davey Richards on August 28 which he then lost by submission. On September 11 at Glory By Honor IX, in his final ROH appearance, Black lost the ROH World Championship to Roderick Strong in a no disqualification match with Terry Funk as a guest enforcer, ending his reign at 210 days after seven successful title defenses.

World Wrestling Entertainment/WWE

Developmental territories (2010–2012)
On August 8, 2010, Lopez signed a developmental contract with WWE and was assigned to their developmental territory Florida Championship Wrestling (FCW) in September. On September 14, Black made his WWE debut in a dark match prior to the SmackDown taping by defeating Trent Barreta.

Lopez debuted for FCW on September 30 under the name Seth Rollins, in a loss to Michael McGillicutty. Rollins then faced Hunico on November 4 in the first ever FCW 15 match under 15-minute Iron Man rules where they fought to a 1–1 draw. Following this, Rollins, along with Hunico, Richie Steamboat and Jinder Mahal, participated in the FCW 15 Jack Brisco Classic tournament. On January 13, 2011, Rollins defeated Hunico in the finals to win the tournament and became the inaugural FCW Jack Brisco 15 Champion. On March 25 at a house show, Rollins and Richie Steamboat defeated Damien Sandow and Titus O'Neil to win the FCW Florida Tag Team Championship. Rollins and Steamboat eventually lost the championship to Big E Langston and Calvin Raines.

In July 2011, Rollins began a feud with Dean Ambrose. Ambrose and Rollins had their first match for the FCW 15 Championship in a 15-minute Iron Man match on the August 14 episode of FCW, which ended in a draw with neither men scoring a fall and, as a result, Rollins retained his title. A subsequent 20-minute rematch for the title two weeks later resulted in a similar 0–0 draw. A second 30-minute rematch for the title on the September 18 episode of FCW went to a time limit 2–2 draw and the match was sent into sudden death overtime, where Rollins scored a pinfall to win the match 3–2. On September 22, Rollins lost the FCW 15 Championship to Damien Sandow by disqualification after Ambrose attacked Sandow late in the match.

On February 23, 2012, Rollins defeated Leo Kruger to become the new FCW Florida Heavyweight Champion. Rollins lost the championship to Rick Victor at a house show on May 31.

When WWE rebranded FCW into NXT in August 2012, Rollins' NXT TV debut took place on the second episode of the rebooted NXT at Full Sail University on June 27, when he defeated Jiro. Rollins entered the Gold Rush Tournament to crown the inaugural NXT Champion where he defeated Jinder Mahal in the tournament finals on the August 29 episode of NXT. On the October 10 episode of NXT, Rollins had his first successful defense of his title after he beat Michael McGillicutty.

The Shield (2012–2014)

On November 18, 2012, at the Survivor Series pay-per-view, Rollins made his main roster debut as a heel alongside Dean Ambrose and Roman Reigns, attacking Ryback during the triple threat main event for the WWE Championship, allowing CM Punk to pin John Cena and retain the title. The trio declared themselves The Shield, vowed to rally against "injustice" and denied working for Punk, but routinely emerged from the crowd to attack Punk's adversaries. This led to a Tables, Ladders and Chairs match at TLC: Tables, Ladders & Chairs on December 16, where The Shield defeated Team Hell No (Daniel Bryan and Kane) and Ryback in their WWE debut match. Rollins continued to appear on NXT and defend the NXT Championship, until he lost it to Big E Langston on the January 9, 2013 episode of NXT. The Shield continued to aid Punk after TLC, attacking both Ryback and The Rock in January 2013. It was revealed on the January 28 episode of Raw that Punk and his manager Paul Heyman had been paying The Shield and Brad Maddox to work for them.

The Shield then quietly ended their association with Punk while beginning a feud with John Cena, Ryback and Sheamus that led to a six-man tag match on February 17 at Elimination Chamber, which The Shield won. The Shield then faced Sheamus, Big Show and Randy Orton at WrestleMania 29 on April 7, where The Shield emerged victorious in their first WrestleMania match. The following night on Raw, The Shield attempted to attack The Undertaker, but were stopped by Team Hell No. This set up a six-man tag team match on the April 22 episode of Raw, which The Shield won. On the May 13 episode of Raw, The Shield's undefeated streak in televised six-man tag team matches ended in a disqualification loss in a six-man elimination tag team match against John Cena, Kane and Daniel Bryan.

On May 19 at Extreme Rules, Rollins and Reigns defeated Team Hell No in a tornado tag team match to win the WWE Tag Team Championship. On the June 14 episode of SmackDown, The Shield suffered their first decisive loss in televised six-man tag team matches against Team Hell No and Randy Orton when Bryan made Rollins submit. Rollins and Reigns then successfully retained the WWE Tag Team Championship against Bryan and Orton at Payback on June 13. In August, The Shield began working for Chief operating officer Triple H and The Authority. They retained their titles against The Usos during the Money in the Bank pre-show on July 14 and against The Prime Time Players (Darren Young and Titus O'Neil) at Night of Champions on September 15. At Battleground on October 6, the recently (kayfabe) fired Cody Rhodes and Goldust reclaimed their jobs by beating Rollins and Reigns in a non-title match. 

On the October 14 episode of Raw, Rollins and Reigns lost the titles to Cody Rhodes and Goldust in a No Disqualification match following interference from Big Show. At Hell in a Cell on October 27, Rollins and Reigns failed to regain the titles in a triple threat match also involving The Usos. At Survivor Series on November 24, The Shield teamed with Antonio Cesaro and Jack Swagger, facing Rey Mysterio, The Usos, Cody Rhodes and Goldust in a traditional Survivor Series match. Although Rollins was eliminated by Mysterio, Reigns won the match for the team. At TLC: Tables, Ladders & Chairs on December 15, The Shield lost to CM Punk in 3-on-1 handicap match after Reigns accidentally speared Ambrose. At the Royal Rumble on January 26, 2014, Rollins entered his first Royal Rumble match at #2, gaining three eliminations before he was eliminated by teammate Reigns. The next night on Raw, The Shield competed against Daniel Bryan, Sheamus and John Cena in a six-man tag team qualifying match to enter the Elimination Chamber match for the WWE World Heavyweight Championship, but lost the match via disqualification after The Wyatt Family (Bray Wyatt, Erick Rowan and Luke Harper) interfered and attacked Cena, Bryan, and Sheamus. At Elimination Chamber on February 23, The Shield lost a rematch to the Wyatt Family.

Later in March, The Shield began a feud with Kane, turning face in the process. At WrestleMania XXX on April 6, The Shield defeated Kane and The New Age Outlaws (Billy Gunn and Road Dogg), thus winning their second WrestleMania match as a group. The Shield then feuded with Triple H, the COO of WWE and leader of The Authority, who then reformed Evolution with Batista and Randy Orton to take on The Shield. The Shield defeated Evolution at Extreme Rules on May 4 and again at Payback on June 1 in a No Holds Barred elimination match, in which no members of The Shield were eliminated.

WWE World Heavyweight Champion (2014–2016)

On the June 2 episode of Raw, Rollins turned on Ambrose and Reigns to rejoin The Authority, turning heel once again. He entered himself into the Money in the Bank ladder match at the titular event on June 29, which he won after interference from Kane. Rollins defeated Ambrose at Battleground on July 20 via forfeit after their match was called off by Triple H after a pre-match attack by Ambrose on Rollins backstage as well as at SummerSlam on August 17 in a lumberjack match after hitting him with his Money in the Bank briefcase following interference from Kane. The following night on Raw, Rollins defeated Ambrose once again in a Falls Count Anywhere match by referee stoppage after Kane interfered again and helped Rollins execute a Curb Stomp on Ambrose through cinder blocks, giving him a kayfabe injury. Rollins then began feuding with Roman Reigns and a match between the two was set up for Night of Champions on September 21, but Reigns developed a legitimate incarcerated hernia which required surgery prior to the event, resulting in Rollins being declared the winner via forfeit, before being attacked by a returning Ambrose. Shortly after, Rollins adopted Jamie Noble and Joey Mercury as bodyguards, being named "J&J Security". The feud between Rollins and Ambrose culminated at Hell in a Cell on October 26, where Rollins defeated Ambrose in a Hell in a Cell match after Bray Wyatt interfered and attacked Ambrose. Following Hell in a Cell, tension began growing between Rollins and Randy Orton due to The Authority's preferential treatment of Rollins, leading to a match between the two on the November 3 episode of Raw, which Rollins won. After the match, Orton attacked The Authority but was overpowered, resulting in Rollins performing a Curb Stomp on Orton onto the steel ring steps, kayfabe injuring him. At Survivor Series on November 23, Rollins captained Team Authority in a five-on-five elimination tag team match against Team Cena, in which he was the sole survivor for his team and the last man eliminated by Dolph Ziggler, resulting in The Authority being ousted from control of WWE. At TLC: Tables, Ladders & Chairs on December 14, he lost to Cena in a tables match.

On the January 5, 2015 episode of Raw, The Authority regained control over WWE. Rollins competed in a triple threat match for the WWE World Heavyweight Championship against Cena and champion Brock Lesnar at the Royal Rumble on January 25, which Lesnar won after pinning Rollins. At Fastlane on February 22, Rollins, Big Show and Kane defeated Ziggler, Erick Rowan and Ryback; however after the match Randy Orton returned and attacked Noble, Mercury and Kane, while Rollins fled the arena. After weeks of teasing a reunion with The Authority, Orton eventually attacked Rollins, which led to a match between the two at WrestleMania 31 on March 29, which Rollins lost. Later that night, Rollins cashed in his Money in the Bank contract during Lesnar and Reigns' WWE World Heavyweight Championship match, turning it into a triple threat match and pinned Reigns to win the title for the first time in his career, making him the first man to cash in his Money in the Bank contract at WrestleMania and during a title match. Rollins continued his feud with Orton after WrestleMania, which led to a steel cage match for the championship with Kane residing as special guest "gatekeeper" at Extreme Rules on April 26, where Rollins retained after interference from the latter. At Payback on May 17, Rollins retained the title against Orton, Reigns, and Ambrose in a fatal-four-way match after pinning Orton. Rollins then retained the championship against Ambrose on May 31 at Elimination Chamber after getting himself disqualified. Rollins again retained over Ambrose at Money in the Bank on June 14 in a ladder match.

At Battleground on July 19, Rollins retained the title by disqualification against Brock Lesnar after The Undertaker interfered and attacked Lesnar. In August, Rollins continued his feud with United States Champion John Cena. He defeated Cena in a Winner Takes All match at SummerSlam on August 23 for both the WWE World Heavyweight and the United States Championships after interference from Jon Stewart. With the win, Rollins became the first and only wrestler to hold both championships simultaneously until he went on to lose the United States Championship back to Cena at Night of Champions on September 20, but was able to retain the WWE World Heavyweight Championship against Sting later that night. On October 25 at Hell in a Cell, Rollins successfully defended the championship against Kane and per the match stipulation, Kane was fired as Director of Operations.

On November 4, during a match against Kane at a WWE live event in Dublin, Ireland, Rollins tore the ACL, MCL and medial meniscus in his knee while attempting to execute a sunset flip powerbomb. The injury required surgery and it was estimated it would take Rollins out of action for approximately six to nine months, therefore he was forced to vacate the WWE World Heavyweight Championship the next day, ending his reign at 220 days. WWE recognizes his reign as lasting 219 days. On the December 21 episode of Raw, Rollins made a special appearance to accept his Slammy Award for 2015 Superstar of the Year.

At Extreme Rules on May 22, 2016, Rollins returned from injury, attacking Roman Reigns with a Pedigree after his WWE World Heavyweight Championship defense against AJ Styles. The following night on Raw, Shane McMahon scheduled a match between Reigns and Rollins for the title at Money in the Bank. At the event on June 19, Rollins defeated Reigns to win his second WWE World Heavyweight Championship, becoming the first wrestler to legitimately defeat Reigns in singles competition on the main roster, only to lose the title minutes later to Dean Ambrose, who cashed in the Money in the Bank contract he won earlier that night. In July, Rollins failed to regain the renamed WWE Championship from Ambrose on both Raw and SmackDown. In the 2016 WWE draft on July 19, Rollins was drafted to Raw as the brand's first draft pick. At Battleground on July 24, Rollins unsuccessfully competed in a triple threat match against Ambrose and Reigns for the newly renamed WWE World Championship, which became exclusive to the SmackDown brand. Because of this, the WWE Universal Championship was introduced the following night on Raw. Rollins lost the inaugural title match against Finn Bálor on August 21 at SummerSlam.

The Shield reunion (2016–2017)
After Bálor relinquished the title the following night on Raw due to a legit shoulder injury sustained at SummerSlam, Rollins faced Big Cass, Kevin Owens and Roman Reigns in a four-way elimination match for the title, but Triple H interfered and attacked Rollins, allowing Owens to win the championship. On the September 5 episode of Raw, Rollins attacked Owens during his celebration ceremony, turning face for the first time since 2014. Rollins failed to win the title from Owens at Clash of Champions on September 25 and Hell in a Cell on October 30 due to several interferences from Chris Jericho. At Survivor Series on November 20, Rollins formed part of Team Raw with Owens, Jericho, Braun Strowman and Roman Reigns in a losing effort to Team SmackDown. At Roadblock: End of the Line on December 18, Rollins defeated Jericho.In January 2017, Rollins started a feud with Triple H leading into WrestleMania. On January 28, Rollins appeared at NXT TakeOver: San Antonio, interrupting the show and demanding to confront Triple H, who came out only to order security to remove Rollins from the ring. On the January 30 episode of Raw, Rollins confronted Stephanie McMahon and once again called out Triple H, demanding answers for his betrayal. Later that night, Rollins was ambushed from behind by the debuting Samoa Joe, who choked him out in the Coquina Clutch. Rollins signed a contract to compete against Triple H in a non-sanctioned match on April 2 at WrestleMania 33 which he won. Rollins defeated Samoa Joe at Payback on April 30 to give Joe his first singles loss on the main roster. At Extreme Rules on June 4, Rollins competed in a fatal five-way Extreme Rules match to determine the number one contender to the WWE Universal Championship also involving Bálor, Joe, Reigns and Wyatt, which Joe won.

On the July 10 episode of Raw, Rollins saved Dean Ambrose from an attack by The Miz and the Miztourage (Curtis Axel and Bo Dallas). After failing to gain Ambrose's trust for several weeks, the two argued in the ring on the August 14 episode of Raw and brawled with each other before fighting off Cesaro and Sheamus, reuniting the team in the process. At SummerSlam on August 20, Ambrose and Rollins defeated Cesaro and Sheamus to win the Raw Tag Team Championship and retained the titles in a rematch at No Mercy on September 24. On the October 9 episode of Raw, Rollins and Ambrose reunited with Roman Reigns. The newly reformed Shield was due to face Braun Strowman, Cesaro, Kane, The Miz and Sheamus at TLC on October 22 in a 5-on-3 handicap Tables, Ladders and Chairs match, but Reigns was replaced over an illness concern by Kurt Angle and they won the match. Ambrose and Rollins lost the titles back to Cesaro and Sheamus on the November 6 episode of Raw due to SmackDown's The New Day distracting the champions, ending their reign at 78 days (WWE recognizes their reign as lasting 79 days). At Survivor Series on November 19, The Shield defeated The New Day. In December, Ambrose suffered a torn biceps, sidelining him for approximately nine months, putting The Shield on hiatus.

Intercontinental Champion (2017–2018)
On the December 25 episode of Raw, Rollins and Jason Jordan defeated Cesaro and Sheamus to become the new Raw Tag Team Champions. At the Royal Rumble on January 28, 2018, Rollins entered at #18 in the Royal Rumble match but was eliminated by Reigns. Right after the Royal Rumble match, Rollins and Jordan lost the tag titles to Cesaro and Sheamus, ending their reign at 34 days. Rollins and Jordan's tag team dissolved on February 6 after Jordan had neck surgery.

Following this, Rollins was named as a competitor in the Elimination Chamber match to determine the #1 contender for the Universal Championship, which would take place at Elimination Chamber. On the February 19 episode of Raw, Rollins competed in a seven-men gauntlet match to decide who would enter the Elimination Chamber match last, where he eliminated Roman Reigns in the first and then John Cena in the second fall, before he was eliminated by Elias. Rollins wrestled for one hour and five minutes, which is the longest performance in a match by any wrestler in the show's history. Six days later, at Elimination Chamber, Rollins was the fifth man eliminated by Braun Strowman in the match.

On April 8 at WrestleMania 34, Rollins defeated Finn Bálor and The Miz in a triple threat match to win the Intercontinental Championship for the first time in his career. With his win, Rollins became the twenty-ninth Triple Crown Champion and the eighteenth Grand Slam Champion in WWE history, respectively. After retaining the title against The Miz in a rematch at Backlash on May 6 and Elias on June 17 at Money in the Bank, Rollins dropped the championship the following night on Raw to Dolph Ziggler after a distraction by Ziggler's ally Drew McIntyre, ending his reign at 71 days. Rollins failed to regain the title from Ziggler in a 30-minute Iron Man match at Extreme Rules on July 15 after interference from McIntyre, but at SummerSlam on August 19, Rollins defeated Ziggler to regain the championship after enlisting the help of a returning Dean Ambrose.

The next night on Raw, Rollins reformed The Shield with Ambrose and Roman Reigns, preventing Strowman from cashing in his Money in the Bank contract for the Universal Championship against Reigns. At Hell in a Cell on September 16, Rollins and Ambrose failed to win the Raw Tag Team Championship from McIntyre and Ziggler. At Super Show-Down on October 6, The Shield defeated McIntyre, Ziggler and Strowman in a six-man tag team match. Two nights later on Raw, The Shield was defeated by the trio in a rematch, with Ambrose walking away from his teammates after their defeat.

Universal Champion (2018–2019)
On the October 22 episode of Raw, Reigns took a hiatus due to his returning leukemia. Later that night, Rollins and Ambrose defeated Ziggler and McIntyre to win the Raw Tag Team Championship (making Rollins a double champion), only for Ambrose to turn on Rollins as he attacked him, igniting a feud between the two and disbanding The Shield once again. Rollins and Ambrose lost the titles on the November 5 episode of Raw, when Rollins lost a handicap match to AOP (Akam and Rezar). On November 18 at Survivor Series, Rollins defeated United States Champion Shinsuke Nakamura in an interbrand champion vs. champion match. On December 16 at TLC, Rollins lost the Intercontinental Championship to Ambrose, ending his reign at 119 days. Rollins failed to regain the championship from Ambrose on several occasions, including in a Falls Count Anywhere match when Bobby Lashley interfered, and in a triple threat match where Lashley won the championship after pinning Ambrose.

On January 27, 2019, at the Royal Rumble, Rollins won his first Royal Rumble match by lastly eliminating Braun Strowman. The following night on Raw, Rollins challenged Brock Lesnar for the Universal Championship at WrestleMania 35. Soon after, Rollins reconciled with Ambrose and the recently returned Reigns to reform The Shield for the third time. The trio defeated Drew McIntyre, Bobby Lashley and Baron Corbin on March 10 at Fastlane. At WrestleMania 35 on April 7, Rollins defeated Lesnar to win the Universal Championship for the first time.

Rollins then entered a feud with AJ Styles, retaining the Universal Championship against him on May 19 at Money in the Bank. Rollins successfully defended the title against Corbin at Super ShowDown on June 7, and at Stomping Grounds on June 23; the latter title defense featured Lacey Evans as special guest referee. He won with assistance of his real-life wife and Raw Women's Champion Becky Lynch to overcome the biased refereeing from Evans. Rollins and Lynch defeated Corbin and Evans at Extreme Rules on July 14 in a Winner Takes All Extreme Rules match mixed tag team match. Afterwards, Rollins lost the title to Lesnar, who cashed in his Money in the Bank contract, ending his reign at 98 days. The following night on Raw, Rollins won a ten-man battle royal for the right to face Lesnar for the championship at SummerSlam by last eliminating Randy Orton. At the event on August 11, Rollins defeated Lesnar to regain the championship, making him the second wrestler to hold the Universal Championship more than once. He also became the first superstar to defeat Lesnar at both WrestleMania and SummerSlam.

On the August 19 episode of Raw, Rollins won his record-tying fifth Raw Tag Team Championship along with Braun Strowman when they defeated Karl Anderson and Luke Gallows. At Clash of Champions on September 15, Rollins and Strowman lost the titles to Dolph Ziggler and Robert Roode. Later that night, Rollins retained the Universal Championship against Strowman but was attacked by "The Fiend" Bray Wyatt after the match. At Hell in a Cell on October 6, Rollins defended his title against The Fiend in a Hell in a Cell match that ended in referee stoppage after The Fiend was buried under several weapons and hit with a sledgehammer by Rollins, a decision which was negatively received by critics and fans. On October 31 at Crown Jewel, Rollins lost the Universal Championship to The Fiend in a falls count anywhere match, ending his second reign at 80 days.

The Messiah (2019–2020) 
Rollins was selected as the captain for Team Raw against Team SmackDown and Team NXT on November 24 at Survivor Series, where Team SmackDown emerged victorious. The following night on Raw, Rollins berated the entire Raw roster for "dropping the ball" and failing to win at the pay-per-view. These comments later drew the attention of Kevin Owens, who attacked Rollins and challenged him to a match, which ended in a disqualification after AOP (Akam and Rezar) attacked Owens. On the December 9 episode of Raw, despite earlier denying an alliance with AOP, Rollins joined them by attacking Owens, turning heel for the first time since 2016.

After this, Rollins began calling himself the "Monday Night Messiah" while stating that he was "sacrificing" his opponents for "the greater good" and created a faction with AOP and Buddy Murphy. Rollins and Murphy defeated The Viking Raiders to win the Raw Tag Team Championship on the January 20, 2020 episode of Raw, becoming a record six-time champion. Rollins competed in the Royal Rumble on January 26, 2020, as the final entrant, but was eliminated by eventual winner Drew McIntyre. Rollins and Murphy retained the titles against The Street Profits at Super ShowDown on February 27, but lost the titles to them on the March 2 episode of Raw. Rollins and Murphy failed to reclaim the championship from the Street Profits at Elimination Chamber six days later. At WrestleMania 36 on April 4, Rollins faced Owens in No Disqualification match, which he lost ending their feud.

At Money in the Bank on May 10, Rollins unsuccessfully challenged Drew McIntyre for the WWE Championship. The next night on Raw, Rollins attacked Rey Mysterio and injured his eye with the steel ring steps. On the May 18 episode of Raw, Rollins recruited Austin Theory as a member of his faction. Mysterio eventually returned and challenged Rollins to an Eye for an Eye match, where the only way to win was to extract the opponent's eyeball. The match took place at The Horror Show at Extreme Rules on July 19, which Rollins won after using the ring steps to remove Mysterio's eye. Over the following weeks, Rey Mysterio's son Dominik confronted Rollins about the attacks on both him and his father. At SummerSlam on August 23, Rollins defeated Dominik in a Street Fight. The following night on Raw, a tag team match was set up between Rollins and Murphy against Rey and Dominik Mysterio at Payback on August 30, where Rollins and Murphy lost to Rey and Dominik.

On the October 5 episode of Raw, Murphy attacked Rollins after he refused to apologize to him, thus ending their alliance. As part of the 2020 WWE draft in October, Rollins was drafted to the SmackDown brand. On the November 20 episode of SmackDown, Rollins lost to Murphy to end the feud. At Survivor Series two days later, Rollins was a part of Team SmackDown, but was the first person eliminated by Sheamus after "sacrificing" himself and his team lost the match.

The Visionary (2021–present)
After a two month hiatus, Rollins returned at the Royal Rumble on January 31, 2021, entering at #29 and lasting until the final three before being eliminated by eventual winner Edge. Rollins made his return to SmackDown on the February 12 episode, stating he was the leader that SmackDown needed and that the SmackDown roster needed to "embrace the vision", prompting the locker room to walk out on him. Rollins then attacked Cesaro, who was the only one that stayed behind, beginning a feud with him. At Fastlane on March 21, Rollins defeated Shinsuke Nakamura. On the first night of WrestleMania 37 on April 10, Rollins lost to Cesaro. At WrestleMania Backlash on May 16, Rollins made an appearance to attack Cesaro with a steel chair. On June 20 at Hell in a Cell, Rollins defeated Cesaro. On the July 9 episode of SmackDown, Rollins defeated Cesaro again to qualify for the Money in the Bank ladder match at the titular event, ending their feud in the process. At Money in the Bank on July 18, Rollins was unsuccessful in winning the contract, as the match was won by Big E.

On the same night, Rollins interfered in the main event where Roman Reigns was defending the Universal Championship against Edge, distracting the referee to cost Edge the match. Over the following weeks, Rollins and Edge confronted and attacked each other until the August 6 episode of SmackDown, where Edge challenged Rollins to a match at SummerSlam, which Rollins accepted. At the event on August 21, Edge defeated Rollins by submission. A rematch took place on the September 10 episode of SmackDown, where Rollins emerged victorious. As part of the 2021 Draft, Rollins was drafted to the Raw brand. On the October 8 episode of SmackDown, Edge demanded a Hell in a Cell match between them, which was made official for Crown Jewel. At the event on October 21, Rollins was defeated by Edge, thus ending their feud. At Survivor Series on November 21, Rollins took part in the 5-on-5 elimination match on Team Raw and won the match as the sole survivor after eliminating Jeff Hardy.

On the October 25 episode of Raw, Rollins defeated Finn Bálor, Kevin Owens, and Rey Mysterio in a fatal four-way ladder match to become the #1 contender for the WWE Championship against Big E at Day 1. Over the following weeks, Kevin Owens and Bobby Lashley were also added to the WWE Championship match at Day 1, making it a fatal four-way match. At Day 1 on January 1, 2022, Rollins failed to win the title as Brock Lesnar was added to the match and won the title. At the Royal Rumble on January 29, Rollins faced SmackDown's Roman Reigns for the Universal Championship, winning the match by disqualification but not the title. On February 18 at Elimination Chamber, he challenged for the WWE Championship inside the namesake structure, but was eliminated by Lesnar. Rollins then unsuccessfully attempted to find a spot on the card at WrestleMania 38, until Mr. McMahon announced that Rollins would face an opponent of his choosing on the March 28 episode of Raw. On the first night of the event on April 2, Rollins' opponent was unveiled as a returning Cody Rhodes, who defeated Rollins.

At WrestleMania Backlash on May 8, Rollins lost to Rhodes for a second time. On the following episode of Raw, Rollins attacked and laid out Rhodes during his match for the United States Championship against Theory. The following week, Rhodes challenged Rollins to a match at Hell in a Cell, inside the namesake structure, which Rollins accepted. At the event on June 5, Rollins lost to Rhodes for a third time. The match received a 5-star rating from esteemed wrestling journalist Dave Meltzer, making it the first WWE main roster match to receive a 5-star rating since 2011, and the first match of Rollins's career to receive such a rating. On the June 13 episode of Raw, Rollins defeated AJ Styles to qualify for the titular match at Money in the Bank on July 2, which was won by Theory.

Following this, Rollins would start attacking Matt Riddle over the next couple weeks until a match was made between them at SummerSlam. However, the match was postponed after Riddle suffered an injury following an attack by Rollins on the July 25 episode of Raw. Despite this, both Rollins and Riddle appeared at SummerSlam on July 30, engaging in a brawl which saw Rollins come out on top. The match between the two occurred at Clash at the Castle on September 3, where Rollins defeated Riddle. Over the next following weeks, Rollins and Riddle would continue attacking each other until when on the September 19 episode of Raw, it was announced at Extreme Rules, they would have a rematch in a Fight Pit match. At the event on October 8, Rollins lost to Riddle by submission.

On the October 10 episode of Raw, Rollins won the United States Championship for a second time by defeating Bobby Lashley after a returning Brock Lesnar attacked Lashley before the match. This made him the second wrestler (after The Miz) to become a two-time WWE Grand Slam Champion. The following week on Raw, Rollins successfully defended the title against Riddle to end their feud. On the November 7 episode of Raw, Rollins issued an open challenge that was answered by Lashley, who attacked Rollins before the match started. As a result, Mr. Money in the Bank Austin Theory cashed in his contract. However, due to interference from Lashley, Rollins retained the title. Rollins then started a feud with Theory, turning face for the first time since 2019. At Survivor Series WarGames on November 26, Rollins lost the United States Championship to Theory in a triple threat match that also involved Lashley, ending his reign at 47 days. 

On the December 12 episode of Raw, Rollins defeated Lashley to earn another United States Championship match against Theory. On the January 2, 2023 episode of Raw, Rollins failed to regain the title from Theory. On January 28, Rollins entered the Royal Rumble at #15 but was eliminated by Logan Paul. On the January 30 episode of Raw, Rollins defeated Chad Gable in a qualifying match for the Elimination Chamber match for the title. At Elimination Chamber on February 18, Rollins failed to win the title when he was the last person eliminated by Theory after interference from Paul.

Professional wrestling style and persona

Lopez's WWE ring name is a tribute to punk rock musician Henry Rollins. During his time in FCW, Rollins used a superkick to a kneeling opponent called Avada Kedavra as a finisher. For most of his WWE career, Rollins has used the Curb Stomp as a finishing move, often simply referred to as the Stomp. However, the move would be banned by WWE in March 2015, as chairman Vince McMahon thought the Curb Stomp was too "cruel". Rollins resumed use of the move in January 2018. Rollins has also used the Pedigree and a jumping knee strike called the Ripcord Knee as finishing moves.

Throughout his time as a member of The Shield, before the team initially split, his character was that of an "out-spoken hot-head who will do crazy things" to help The Shield. After turning into a villain and aligning himself with AOP in late-2019, Rollins began to dub himself  "Monday Night Messiah" and allude himself to Jesus while debuting a new entrance theme to go along with the new character. He also began recruiting new "disciples" into his group such as Murphy and Austin Theory proclaiming himself to be their leader and savior. In 2021, Rollins adopted his "Visionary" persona, which was a boastful, delusional character that had a reputation for eccentricity and wore flamboyant suits.

Other media
Rollins is regularly featured on Xavier Woods' YouTube channel UpUpDownDown, where he goes by the nickname "Texas Steve". In August 2019, he won a #1 contender's tournament to challenge Samoa Joe for the UpUpDownDown Championship. He defeated Joe in a game of Track & Field II to win the championship. In October, in his first and only defense, he lost the championship to his now-wife Becky Lynch in Marvel vs. Capcom Infinite. In July 2022, he defeated Riddle in the finals of a WWE 2K22 tournament to win the vacant UpUpDownDown Championship, becoming the first person to hold the championship twice.

Personal life
Lopez is an atheist. He is a fan of the Chicago Bears and the St. Louis Cardinals.

In 2014, Lopez and his former tag team partner Marek Brave started a professional wrestling school called The Black & The Brave Wrestling Academy in Moline, Illinois. In February 2019, Lopez opened a coffee shop called 329 Dport in his hometown of Davenport, Iowa.

On February 9, 2015, a nude photo of former NXT wrestler Zahra Schreiber, who reportedly was Lopez's girlfriend, was posted to his social media accounts, the contents of which are automatically republished by WWE.com. Soon after, nude photos of Lopez were posted on the Twitter page of his then-fiancée, Leighla Schultz. In response, Lopez apologized for "private photographs that were distributed without [his] consent". On February 25, 2016, Lopez broke up with Schreiber.

Lopez began dating Irish professional wrestler Rebecca Quin, better known as Becky Lynch, in January 2019. Their relationship was made public in May after months of speculation. As of 2019, the couple lived in Moline. They announced their engagement on August 22, 2019. On May 11, 2020, Quin announced during an episode of Raw that she and Lopez were expecting their first child. Their daughter, Roux, was born on December 4. The couple married on June 29, 2021. Lopez announced their marriage on Instagram.

Filmography

Film

Television

Web series

Video games

Championships and accomplishments

 Absolute Intense Wrestling
AIW Intense Championship (1 time)
 All American Wrestling
 AAW Heavyweight Championship (2 times)
 AAW Tag Team Championship (2 times) – with Marek Brave (1) and Jimmy Jacobs (1)
 Florida Championship Wrestling
 FCW Florida Heavyweight Championship (1 time)
 FCW Jack Brisco 15 Championship (1 time)
 FCW Florida Tag Team Championship (1 time) – with Richie Steamboat
 Jack Brisco Classic (2011)
 First FCW Grand Slam Champion
 Full Impact Pro
 FIP World Heavyweight Championship (1 time)
 Independent Wrestling Association Mid-South
 IWA Mid-South Light Heavyweight Championship (1 time)
 Mr. Chainsaw Productions Wrestling
 MCPW World Heavyweight Championship (1 time)
 NWA Midwest
 NWA Midwest Tag Team Championship (1 time) – with Marek Brave
 New York Post
 Match of the Year (2022) 
 Pro Wrestling Guerrilla
 PWG World Tag Team Championship (1 time) – with Jimmy Jacobs
 Pro Wrestling Illustrated
 Feud of the Year (2014) 
 Most Hated Wrestler of the Year (2015, 2020)
 Tag Team of the Year (2013) 
 Wrestler of the Year (2015)
 Ranked No. 1 of the top 500 singles wrestlers in the PWI 500 in 2015 and 2019
 Ring of Honor
 ROH World Championship (1 time)
 ROH World Tag Team Championship (2 times) – with Jimmy Jacobs
 ROH World Championship No. 1 Contender Tournament (2008)
 ROH World Tag Team Championship Tournament (2008) – with Jimmy Jacobs
 Survival of the Fittest (2009)
 Rolling Stone
 Best Briefly Resuscitated Storyline (2015) 
 Most Puzzling New Finisher (2015) 
 Most Smothered In-Ring Potential (2014)
 Ranked No. 9 of the 10 best WWE wrestlers of 2016
 Sports Illustrated
 Ranked No. 3 of the top 10 men's wrestlers in 2018
 Wrestler of the Year (2022)
 Wrestling Observer Newsletter
 Tag Team of the Year (2013) 
 Worst Feud of the Year (2013) – 
Worst Feud of the Year (2019) 
Worst Match of the Year (2019) 
 WWE
 WWE Championship (2 times)
 WWE Universal Championship (2 times)
 NXT Championship (1 time, inaugural)
 WWE Intercontinental Championship (2 times)
 WWE United States Championship (2 times)
 WWE (Raw) Tag Team Championship (6 times) – with Roman Reigns (1), Dean Ambrose (2), Jason Jordan (1), Braun Strowman (1), and Buddy Murphy/Murphy (1)
 Money in the Bank (2014)
 Men's Royal Rumble (2019)
 Gold Rush Tournament (2012)
 29th Triple Crown Champion
11th Grand Slam Champion (under current format; 19th overall)
Second two-time Grand Slam Champion
 Slammy Award (9 times)
 Anti-Gravity Moment of the Year (2014) 
 Breakout Star of the Year (2013) 
 Double-Cross of the Year (2014) 
 Faction of the Year (2013, 2014) 
 Fan Participation (2014) 
 Match of the Year (2014) 
 Superstar of the Year (2015)
 Trending Now (Hashtag) of the Year (2013) – #BelieveInTheShield 
 WWE Year-End Award for Best Reunion (2018) – 
 Bumpy Award (1 time)
 Best Dressed of the Half-Year (2021) - with Sonya Deville

References

External links
 
 
 
 
 
 
 

1986 births
21st-century professional wrestlers
AAW Heavyweight Champions
AAW Tag Team Champions
American atheists
American male professional wrestlers
American people of German descent
American people of Irish descent
American people of Armenian descent
Armenian professional wrestlers
Ethnic Armenian sportspeople
FIP World Heavyweight Champions
Living people
NWA/WCW/WWE United States Heavyweight Champions
NXT Champions
People from Scott County, Iowa
Professional wrestlers from Iowa
Professional wrestling trainers
PWG World Tag Team Champions
ROH World Champions
ROH World Tag Team Champions
The Authority (professional wrestling) members
WWF/WWE Intercontinental Champions
WWE Champions
WWE Universal Champions
WWE Grand Slam champions
FCW Florida Heavyweight Champions
FCW Jack Brisco 15 Champions
FCW Florida Tag Team Champions